The women's javelin throw at the 2022 World Athletics Championships was held at the Hayward Field in Eugene on 20 and 22 July 2022.

Summary

Kelsey-Lee Barber was back as the defending champion, but she was unable to get an automatic qualifier in the trial round, taking all three throws.  Haruka Kitaguchi, Liu Shiying and Liveta Jasiūnaitė made an auto qualifier on their first attempt and were able to relax.

In the final as the second thrower, Barber's teammate Mackenzie Little took the first round lead with a 63.22m. Barber's 62.67m did put Australia in the top two spots. Kitaguchi was back in third position with a 62.07m. In the fourth round, Liu edged into third position with a 63.25m. In the final round, Kara Winger brought cheers from the home crowd with her 64.05m, to jump from fifth to second. With her final attempt, Kitaguchi, threw a 63.27m to snatch the bronze medal

Records
Before the competition records were as follows:

Qualification standard
The standard to qualify automatically for entry was 64.00 m.

Schedule
The event schedule, in local time (UTC−7), was as follows:

Results

Qualification 
Qualification: Qualifying distance 62.50 (Q) or the 12 best athletes including ties (q) qualify to the final.

Final

References

Javelin throw
Javelin throw at the World Athletics Championships